Collonges is a commune in the Ain department in the Auvergne-Rhône-Alpes region in Eastern France. In 2018, it had a population of 2,222. Collonges is located on the border with the Haute-Savoie department, just northeast of Fort l'Écluse in Léaz, Ain. It is also situated 20 km (12.4 mi) southwest of Geneva, Switzerland.

Demographics

See also
Communes of the Ain department

References

Communes of Ain
Ain communes articles needing translation from French Wikipedia